Tautuiaki Taula Koloamatangi (born February 7, 1991) is an American professional wrestler of Tongan descent. He is currently wrestling for the Japanese promotion New Japan Pro-Wrestling (NJPW), and the U.S. promotion Impact Wrestling under the ring name Hikuleo (ヒクレオ Hikureo), he is a former member of Bullet Club. He has joined his brothers of the Guerrillas of Destiny as of September.

Early life 
Koloamatangi and his elder brother Alipate were adopted by their maternal aunt, Dorothy Koloamatangi, and her husband Tonga Fifita, who brought them to the United States. He was raised in Kissimmee, Florida, attending Osceola High School. He attended Florida's Webber International University, majoring in sport management and playing basketball as a center for the Webber International Warriors. He was named Webber International University's junior varsity men's basketball most valuable player for 2009–2010.

Professional wrestling career

New Japan Pro-Wrestling (2016–present)

Bullet Club (2016–2022)

Koloamatangi was trained to wrestle by Bully Ray and Devon at the Team 3D Academy in Florida. In 2016, he travelled to Japan, where he became a student at the New Japan Pro-Wrestling (NJPW) dojo. Koloamatangi, under the ring name Hikule'o (a reference to the Tongan god), made his professional wrestling debut on November 12, 2016, in Auckland, New Zealand at NJPW's On the Mat Internet pay-per-view, losing to Henare.

Koloamatangi continued his training throughout 2017, serving as a young lion. He rejoined the active NJPW roster in September 2017, taking part in the Destruction tour under the ring name "Leo Tonga". He joined the gaijin heel stable Bullet Club alongside his brothers Tanga Loa and Tama Tonga and his cousin Bad Luck Fale, substituting for the injured Kenny Omega. On January 4, 2018, Koloamatangi appeared at Wrestle Kingdom 12, the 27th annual January 4 Tokyo Dome Show (NJPW's annual flagship event), taking part in a New Japan Rumble. At The New Beginning in Sapporo later that month, Koloamatangi changed his ring name to "Hikuleo". In March 2018, Hikuleo sustained an injury to his anterior cruciate ligament.

After recuperating and spending six months training at the NJPW Dojo in Los Angeles, Hikuleo returned at Honor Rising: Japan in February 2019, accompanying his brothers to ringside. Hikuleo competed in the 2019 New Japan Cup for the first time in his career, in which he was eliminated in the first round by Mikey Nicholls. Following that, Hikuleo debuted in The European promotion Revolution Pro Wrestling for his excursion to gain more experience and training, losing to Dan Magee in his first match on June 29. Hikuleo was absent from NJPW for a year from September 2019; he returned in September 2020 on the NJPW's United States show, NJPW Strong, defeating Brody King. In March of the following year, Hikuleo competed in the New Japan Cup USA tournament, defeating Jordan Clearwater to qualify for the tournament. In the first round, Hikuleo defeated Fred Rosser,  but lost in the semi-final round to eventual tournament winner Tom Lawlor. In August, Hikuleo was defeated by Juice Robinson at NJPW Resurgence.

Guerillas of Destiny (2022–present)

Following The Guerillas of Destiny's ejection from Bullet Club at No Surrender Hikuleo began to become more aggressive to stable leader Jay White, who was responsible for kicking out Hikuleo's brothers. This led to Hikuleo answering White's "U.S of Jay" open challenge at Mutiny in April 2022, however White defeated Hikuleo, who gave White the "too sweet" gesture post-match, confirming his loyalty to Bullet Club. At Windy City Riot, Hikuleo teamed with his Bullet Club stablemates and Scott Norton, losing to United Empire. Hikuleo teamed with White, to defeat Kazuchika Okada and Rocky Romero of Chaos at Capital Collision in May. Hikuleo was scheduled to compete in an 8-man tag-team match at AEW x NJPW: Forbidden Door, teaming with Bullet Club stablemate El Phantasmo and one night only members The Young Bucks against Darby Allin, Sting and Los Ingobernables de Japon members, Hiromu Takahashi and Shingo Takagi, however it was announced that Takahashi wouldn't be able to compete at the event, due to suffering from a fever, so the match was made a six-man tag-team match, without Hikuleo. Despite this, Hikuleo appeared at the event in the corner of Bullet Club. Despite interfering in the match, Bullet Club was defeated by Sting, Allin, and Takagi at the event. In September, Hikuleo made his return to Japan at NJPW Burning Spirit teaming with Kenta and Taiji Ishimori to defeat Togi Makabe, Tomoaki Honma and Kushida. Later in the Burning Spirit tour on September 25, Hikuleo betrayed Bullet Club by attacking Jay White along with Tama Tonga, turning face and joining the Guerillas of Destiny stable with his brothers Tama Tonga and Tonga Loa along with Jado.

All Elite Wrestling (2021–2022) 
Hikuleo appeared in the crowd on Night 2 of Fyter Fest, watching the IWGP United States Championship match between Jon Moxley and Lance Archer, thus making his All Elite Wrestling (AEW) debut. After Archer's victory, Hikuleo entered the ring staring off with Archer, hinting at a future match between the two for the title. The match was scheduled for the following week at Fight for the Fallen, where Hikuleo, who was accompanied to the ring by his father King Haku, lost to Archer. Hikuleo appeared on the August 11th episode of AEW Dark, defeating Thad Brown.

Hikuleo returned to AEW on the June 1 episode of AEW Dynamite teaming with Undisputed Elite members The Young Bucks and reDRagon to defeat the Jurassic Express, Christian Cage, Matt Hardy and Darby Allin in a ten-man tag-team match.

Impact Wrestling (2021–present)
In the summer of 2021, Hikuleo would begin to make appearances in another NJPW partner promotion in the U.S., Impact Wrestling.  By fall, he would become listed as a member of the Impact roster, and he, Chris Bey, and El Phantasmo established themselves as a U.S. based branch of Bullet Club in Impact Wrestling. Hikuleo teamed with Bey in his Impact debut, defeating FinJuice at Victory Road. On the October 21st episode of Impact!, Hikuleo and Bey faced off in a #1 contendership match for the Impact World Tag Team Championship, but the match ended in a no contest. Therefore, at Bound for Glory, a three-way tag-team match was set up between the two teams and Tag Team Champions, The Good Brothers with the titles on the line. At the event, The Good Brothers retained the championships. At Turning Point in November, Bey and Hikuleo were once again unsuccessful in capturing the Impact World Tag Team Championships from The Good Brothers.

Hikuleo returned to Impact programming in November at Emergence, teaming with Bullet Club stablemates to lose to Honor No More in a 12-man tag-team match.

Personal life
A second generation professional wrestler, Koloamatangi is the nephew and adopted son of professional wrestler Haku and his wife Dorothy Koloamatangi. He has a half-brother, Tama Tonga, and is the cousin and adopted brother of Tanga Loa and Vika. He is also the adopted cousin of Bad Luck Fale.

See also 
 Bullet Club

References

External links 
 
 
 
 

1991 births
American adoptees
American male professional wrestlers
American people of Tongan descent
Bullet Club members
Centers (basketball)
Expatriate professional wrestlers in Japan
Living people
People from Kissimmee, Florida
Professional wrestlers from Florida
Tongan male professional wrestlers
Webber International University alumni
Webber International Warriors